Premature burial, also known as live burial, burial alive, or vivisepulture, means to be buried while still alive.

Animals or humans may be buried alive accidentally on the mistaken assumption that they are dead, or intentionally as a form of torture, murder, or execution. It may also occur with the consent of the victim as a part of a stunt, with the intention to escape.

Fear of being buried alive is reported to be among the most common phobias.

Physiology 
Premature burial can lead to death through the following: asphyxiation, dehydration, starvation, or (in cold climates) hypothermia. A person trapped with fresh air to breathe can last a considerable time and burial has been used as a very cruel method of execution (as in cases of Vestal Virgins who violated the oath of celibacy), lasting sufficiently long for the victim to comprehend and imagine every stage of what is happening (being trapped in total darkness with very limited or no movement) and to experience great psychological and physical torment including extreme panic. The medical term for the fear of being buried alive is taphophobia.

Types

Unintentional

Accidental burial 
According to a popular legend recorded by Joannes Zonaras and George Kedrenos, two 11th-century and 12th-century Byzantine Greek historians, the 5th century Roman emperor Zeno was buried alive in Constantinople after becoming insensible from drinking or an illness. For three days cries of "Have pity on me!" could be heard from within his verd antique sarcophagus in the Church of the Holy Apostles, but because of the hatred of his wife and subjects, the empress Ariadne refused to open the tomb. This tale is not likely, as earlier and contemporary sources do not mention it, even though they too were hostile to Zeno's memory.

Revivals of supposed "corpses" have been triggered by dropped coffins, grave robbers, embalming, and attempted dissections. Folklorist Paul Barber has argued that the incidence of unintentional live burial has been overestimated and that the normal, physical effects of decomposition are sometimes misinterpreted as signs that the person whose remains are being exhumed had revived in his or her coffin. Nevertheless, patients have been documented as late as the 1890s as accidentally being sent to the morgue or trapped in a steel box after erroneously being declared dead.

Newspapers have reported cases of exhumed corpses that appear to have been accidentally buried alive. On February 21, 1885, The New York Times gave a disturbing account of such a case. The victim was a man from Buncombe County, North Carolina whose name was given as "Jenkins". His body was found turned over onto its front inside the coffin, with much of his hair pulled out. Scratch marks were also visible on all sides of the coffin's interior. His family was reportedly "distressed beyond measure at the criminal carelessness" associated with the case. Another similar story was reported in The Times on January 18, 1886, the victim of this case being described simply as a "girl" named "Collins" from Woodstock, Ontario, Canada. Her body was described as being found with the knees tucked up under the body, and her burial shroud "torn into shreds".

In 2001, a body bag was delivered to the Matarese Funeral Home in Ashland, Massachusetts with a live occupant. Funeral director John Matarese discovered this, called paramedics, and avoided live embalming or premature burial.

In 2014 in Peraia, Thessaloniki, in Macedonia, Greece, the police discovered that a 45-year-old woman was buried alive and died of asphyxia after being declared clinically dead by a private hospital; she was discovered just shortly after being buried, by children playing near the cemetery who heard screams from inside the earth; her family was reported to be considering suing the hospital which was responsible. In 2015, it was reported that a separate incident also occurred in 2014 in Peraia, Thessaloniki. In Macedonia, Greece, a police investigation concluded that a 49-year-old woman was buried alive after being declared dead due to cancer; her family reported that they could hear her scream from inside the earth at the cemetery shortly after burial, and the investigation revealed that she died of heart failure inside her coffin. Later, it was discovered that medication given to her by her physicians as part of her cancer treatment was what caused her to be mistakenly declared clinically dead.

The family of Timesha Beauchamp of Southfield, Michigan called 911 on August 23, 2020, when they found her unresponsive at home. Upon arrival, paramedics found her to be unresponsive and not breathing. After they provided cardiopulmonary resuscitation for 30 minutes, she was pronounced dead by a local emergency department physician based on the medical information provided by the paramedics on the scene. Resuscitation efforts were discontinued, and Beauchamp was taken to a funeral home in Detroit. Staff at the funeral home were preparing to embalm her body when they found her to be breathing. She was taken to Children’s Hospital of Michigan, where she died on October 18, 2020.

Natural disasters 
Natural disasters (earthquakes, landslides, mudslides, avalanches) have also buried people alive, as well as collapsing mines.

Attempts at prevention 

According to the history of Nicephorus and perhaps because of the legend of Zeno's premature entombment, or perhaps for other reasons, the Proconnesian marble sarcophagus of the 7th-century emperor Heraclius was left open, on his own instructions, for three days after his interment in the Church of the Holy Apostles' Mausoleum of Justinian.

Robert Robinson died in Manchester in 1791. A movable glass pane was inserted in his coffin, and the mausoleum had a door for purposes of inspection by a watchman, who was to see if he breathed on the glass. He instructed his relatives to visit his grave periodically to check that he was actually dead.

Safety coffins were devised to prevent premature burial, although there is no evidence that any have ever been successfully used to save an accidentally buried person. On 5 December 1882, J. G. Krichbaum received  for his "Device For Life In Buried Persons". It consisted of a movable periscope-like pipe that provided air and, when rotated or pushed by the person interred, indicated to passersby that someone was buried alive. The patent text refers to "that class of devices for indicating life in buried persons", suggesting that such inventions were common at the time.

In 1890, a family designed and built a burial vault at the Wildwood Cemetery in Williamsport, Pennsylvania, with an internal hatch to allow the victim of accidental premature burial to escape. The vault had an air supply and was lined in felt to protect a panic-stricken victim from self-inflicted injury before the escape. Bodies were to be removed from the casket before interment.

The London Association for the Prevention of Premature Burial was co-founded in 1896 by William Tebb and Walter Hadwen. Tebb suggested methods such as stethoscopic auscultation of the heart and lungs, application of electric current, and artificial ventilation.

Intentional

Execution 

The burning of books and burying of scholars was a suppression of intellectual thought carried out by Qin Shi Huang, the first emperor of a unified China. Books and texts deemed to be subversive were burned and 460 Confucian scholars were reportedly buried alive in 212 BC. Modern scholars doubt these events – Sima Qian, author of the account of these events in the Records of the Grand Historian, was an official of the Han dynasty, which could be expected to portray the previous rulers unfavorably.

Tacitus, in his work Germania, records that German tribes practiced two forms of capital punishment; the first where the victim was hanged from a tree, and another where the victim was tied to a wicker frame, pushed face down into the mud and buried. The first was used to make an example of traitors; the second was used for punishment of dishonorable or shameful vices, such as cowardice. According to Tacitus, the Ancient Germans thought that crime should be exposed, whereas infamy should be buried out of sight.

Fleta, a medieval commentary on English common law, specified live burial as the punishment for sodomy, bestiality and those who had dealings with Jews or Jewesses.

In Ancient Persia, Herodotus in his book Histories records that burying people alive was a Persian custom, which they practiced in order to be blessed by gods.

In ancient Rome, a Vestal Virgin convicted of violating her vows of celibacy was "buried alive" by being sealed in a cave with a small amount of bread and water, ostensibly so that the goddess Vesta could save her were she truly innocent, essentially making it into a trial by ordeal. This practice was, strictly speaking, immurement (i.e., being walled up and left to die) rather than premature burial. According to Christian tradition, a number of saints were martyred this way, including Saint Castulus and Saint Vitalis of Milan.

In Denmark, in the Ribe city statute, which was promulgated in 1269, a female thief was to be buried alive, and in the law by Queen Margaret I, adulterous women were to be punished with premature burial, men with beheading.

Within the Holy Roman Empire a variety of offenses, including rape, infanticide, and theft, could be punished with live burial. For example, the Schwabenspiegel, a law code from the 13th century, specified that the rape of a virgin should be punished by live burial (whereas the rapist of a non-virgin was to be beheaded). Female murderers of their own employers also risked being buried alive. In Augsburg in 1505, for example, a 12-year-old boy and a 13-year-old girl were found guilty of killing their master in conspiracy with the cook. The boy was beheaded, and the girl and the cook were buried alive beneath the gallows. The jurist Eduard Henke observed that in the Middle Ages, live burial of women guilty of infanticide was a "very frequent" punishment in city statutes and Landrechten. For example, he notes those in Hesse, Bohemia, and Tyrol. The Berlinisches Stadtbuch records that between 1412 and 1447, 10 women were buried alive there, and as late as in 1583, the archbishop of Bremen promulgated (alongside the somewhat milder 1532 Constitutio Criminalis Carolina punishment of drowning) live burial as an alternate execution method for punishing mothers found guilty of infanticide.

As noted by Elias Pufendorf, a woman buried alive would afterward be impaled through the heart. This combined punishment of live burial and impalement was practiced in Nuremberg until 1508 also for women found guilty of theft, but the city council decided in 1515 that the punishment was too cruel and opted for drowning instead. Impalement was, however, not always mentioned together with live burial. Eduard Osenbrüggen relates how the live burial of a woman convicted of infanticide could be pronounced in a court verdict. For example, in a 1570 case in Ensisheim:

In this particular case, however, some noblewomen made an appeal for mercy, and the convicted woman was drowned instead.

Dieter Furcht speculates that the impalement was not so much to be regarded as an execution method, but as a way to prevent the condemned from becoming an avenging, undead Wiedergänger. In medieval Italy, unrepentant murderers were buried alive, head down, feet in the air, a practice referred to in passing in Canto XIX of Dante's Inferno.

In the Faroe Islands, a powerful 14th-century woman landowner in the village of Húsavík was said to have buried two servants alive.

In the 16th century Habsburg Netherlands, when the Catholic authorities made a prolonged effort to stamp out the Protestant churches, live burial was commonly used as the punishment for women found guilty of heresy. The last to be so executed was Anna Utenhoven, an Anabaptist buried alive at Vilvoorde in 1597. Reportedly, when her head was still above the ground she was given the last chance to recant her faith, and upon her refusal, she was completely covered up and suffocated. The case aroused a great deal of protest in the rebellious northern provinces and foiled the peace feelers which King Philip III was at the time extending to the Dutch. Thereafter the Habsburg authorities avoided further such cases, punishing heresy with fines and deportations rather than death.

In the seventeenth century in feudal Russia, live burial as an execution method was known as "the pit" and used against women who were condemned for killing their husbands. In 1689, the punishment of live burial was changed to beheading. Live burial of Jews in such countries as Ukraine is reported; for example, some instances occurred during the Chmielnicki Massacre (1648–1649) in Ukraine.

Among some contemporary indigenous people of Brazil with no or limited contact with the outside world, children with disabilities or other undesirable traits are still customarily buried alive.

There are also accounts of the Khmer Rouge using premature burials as a form of execution in the Killing Fields.

During Mao Zedong's regime, there are some accounts that premature burials were used in executions.

Wars 
It has been used during wars and by mafia organizations.

Serbian officials are documented to have buried living Bulgarian civilians from Pehčevo (now in the Republic of North Macedonia) during the Balkan Wars. During World War II, Japanese soldiers were documented to have buried living Chinese civilians, notably during the Nanking Massacre. This method of execution was also used by German leaders against Jews in Ukraine and Belarus during World War II.

During the Algerian War, French troops used to bury Algerian prisoners or civilians alive.

During the Vietnam War, live burials by the Viet Cong were documented during the massacre at Huế in 1968.

During the Gulf War, Iraqi soldiers were knowingly buried alive by American tanks of the First Infantry Division shoveling earth into their trenches. Estimates for the number of soldiers killed this way vary: one source puts it at "between 80 and 250", while Colonel Anthony Moreno suggested it may have been thousands.

In 2014, ISIS buried Yazidi women and children alive in an attempt to annihilate the Yazidi tribe.

Voluntary 

On rare occasions, people have willingly arranged to be buried alive, reportedly as a demonstration of their controversial ability to survive such an event. In one story taking place around 1840, Sadhu Haridas, an Indian yogi, is said to have been buried in the presence of a British military officer and under the supervision of the local maharajah, by being placed in a sealed bag in a wooden box in a vault. The vault was then interred, the earth was flattened over the site, and crops were sown over the place for a very long time. The whole location was guarded day and night to prevent fraud and the site was dug up twice in a ten-month period to verify the burial before the yogi was finally dug out and slowly revived in the presence of another officer. The yogi said that his only fear during his "wonderful sleep" was being eaten by underground worms. However, according to current medical science, it is not possible for a human to survive for a period of ten months without food, water, and air. According to other sources the entire burial was 40 days long. The Indian government has since made the act of voluntary premature burial illegal, because of the unintended deaths of individuals attempting to recreate this feat.

In 1992, escape artist Bill Shirk was buried alive under seven tons of dirt and cement in a Plexiglas coffin, which collapsed and almost took Shirk's life.

In 2010, a Russian man died after being buried alive to try to overcome his fear of death but was crushed to death by the earth on top of him. The following year, another Russian died after being buried overnight in a makeshift coffin "for good luck".

In 2021, the YouTuber MrBeast was voluntarily buried alive for 50 hours. This event was documented and filmed.

Buried Alive is a controversial art and lecture performance series by art-tech group monochrom. Participants have the opportunity to be buried alive in a coffin for fifteen to twenty minutes. As a framework program monochrom offers lectures about the history of the science of determining death and the medical and cultural history of premature burial.

Myths and legends 
St. Oran was a druid living on the island of Iona in Scotland's Inner Hebrides. He became a follower of St. Columba, who brought Christianity to Iona from Ireland in 563 AD. When St. Columba had repeated problems building the original Iona Abbey, citing interference from the Devil, St. Oran offered himself as a human sacrifice and was buried alive. He was later dug up and found to be still alive, but when he described the afterlife he had seen and how it involved no heaven or hell, he was ordered to be covered up again. The building of the abbey went ahead, untroubled, and St. Oran's chapel marks the spot where the saint was buried.

In the fourteenth through nineteenth centuries, a popular tale about premature burial in European folklore was the "Lady with the Ring". In the story, a woman who was prematurely buried awakens to frighten a grave robber who is attempting to cut a ring off her finger.

The TV show MythBusters tested the myth to see if someone could survive being buried alive for two hours before being rescued. Host Jamie Hyneman attempted the feat, but when his steel coffin began to bend under the weight of the earth used to cover it, the experiment was aborted.

In fiction
The 1980 Italian horror film City of the Living Dead features a woman who is buried alive after being mistaken for dead. She panics and a man hears her cries—he uses a pickaxe to penetrate the casket (nearly killing the woman) and saves her.

Premature burial is a major plot point in Paul Sheldon's Misery's Return, the book-within-a-book in Stephen King's 1987 novel Misery.

In the series 2 finale of The League of Gentlemen, after Justin Smart spurns Herr Lipp's advances, Lipp buries him alive with a snorkel.

In Kill Bill: Volume 2 (2004), Uma Thurman's character The Bride is buried alive. 

In a 2008 episode of BBC soap opera EastEnders, Max Branning was almost buried alive by his wife Tanya Cross but was saved by her at the last minute.

The premise of the 2010 thriller film Buried is that an American contractor in Iraq wakes up having been buried in a coffin with only a mobile phone.

In a 2013 episode of American comedy series The Office titled "The Farm", fictional character Dwight Schrute alludes to a history of premature burials in his family. In order to make sure the "dead were completely dead", Schrute kicks open the coffin of his aunt at her funeral and fires several shotgun rounds at her body.

At the end of Bacurau (2019) Udo Kier's character, Michael, is buried alive by villagers.

See also 
 Edgar Allan Poe returned to the topic of being buried alive repeatedly in his writing. Stories that include the trope are "The Premature Burial", "The Fall of the House of Usher", "Berenice", and "The Cask of Amontillado".
 Eleanor Markham, well known late-19th-century case of narrowly averted premature burial
 Lazarus syndrome, spontaneous return of circulation after failed attempts at resuscitation
 List of premature obituaries
 Locked-in syndrome, medical condition described as "the closest thing to being buried alive"

References

Bibliography

Books

Journals, newspapers, periodicals

Web resources

External links 

 

 
Execution methods